The 36th century BC was a century which lasted from the year 3600 BC to 3501 BC.

Events

 Civilization in Sumer (Uruk period).
 Beginning of the construction of the megalithic Ggantija temple complex in Malta.
 Mnajdra solar temple complex, Malta.
 Colombia, first rupestrian art at Chiribiquete (Caquetá).
 Maize is domesticated at Balsas River by the Tehuacán culture
 In Egypt, evidence found of mummification around this time at a cemetery in Nekhen (Hierankopolis).
 Fortified town at Amri on the west bank of the Indus River.

Cultures 
 Baden culture (present-day Moravia, Hungary, Slovakia and Eastern Austria)
 Funnelbeaker culture (north central Europe and southern Scandinavia)
 Boian culture, Phase IV or Spanţov Phase (also known as the Boian-Gumelniţa culture) (lower Danube river)
 Chasséen culture (present-day France)
 Pfyn culture (present-day Switzerland)
 Cucuteni-Trypillian culture (present-day Romania, Moldova and Ukraine)
 Beginning of Wartberg culture (present-day Germany)

Inventions, discoveries, introductions
 First known evidence of popcorn. Excavations of the Bat Cave in Carlsbad Caverns National Park in New Mexico in 1948 and 1950 discovered ears of popcorn dated to circa 3600 BC.

References

 

-4
-64